Pie is a soldier-loa who lives at the bottoms of lakes and rivers and causes floods in Vodou. Ioa are deistic beings venerated in the African religion of Haitian Vodou.

Voodoo gods
Water gods